In The OPMDEN is the second EP by OPM. It was released on June 18, 2006 by Suburban Noize Records, exactly a month prior to their album California Poppy. The EP features reggae artist Yellowman and a cover of The Clash's 1980 hit Bankrobber.

Track listing
"Eternity" (Featuring Yellowman) - 3:41
"Battle Rhyme" (Featuring Big B) - 4:53
"Set Me Free" - 5:50
"Bank Robber" - 4:16
"Eternity (Rude Mix)" (Featuring Yellowman) - 3:51

Personnel
John E. Necro - Lead vocals
Geoff Turney - Guitar
Jonathan Williams - Keys
Matt Rowe - Bass
Robert Bradley - Drums
Big B - Vocals

2006 EPs
OPM (band) albums
Suburban Noize Records EPs